George Whitmore may refer to:

 George Whitmore (British Army officer) (1775–1862), Major General, British Army
 George W. Whitmore (1824–1876), American politician
 George Whitmore (mountain climber) (1931–2021), American mountain climber and conservationist
 George Whitmore (writer) (1945–1989), American writer
 George Whitmore, Jr., accused and cleared in the Career Girls Murders (1963) 
 George Whitmore (haberdasher) (died 1654), English merchant who was Lord Mayor of London in 1631
 George Stoddart Whitmore (1829–1903), New Zealand soldier, military leader, runholder and politician